Bruno Cosendey Lobo Pinto (born 25 January 1997), commonly known as Bruno Cosendey, is a Brazilian footballer player who plays for V-League club Ho Chi Minh City.

References

1997 births
Living people
Brazilian expatriate footballers
Brazil youth international footballers
Campeonato Brasileiro Série A players
CR Vasco da Gama players
Association football midfielders
Vitória S.C. players
Expatriate footballers in Portugal
Footballers from Rio de Janeiro (city)
Brazilian footballers